qutebrowser (pronounced "cute browser"  ) is a Chromium-based web browser for Linux, Windows, and macOS operating systems with Vim-style key bindings and a minimal GUI. It is keyboard-driven and is inspired by similar software such as Vimperator and dwb. It uses DuckDuckGo as the default search engine. qutebrowser is included in the native repositories of Linux distributions such as Fedora and Arch Linux. qutebrowser is developed by Florian Bruhin, for which he received a CH Open Source award in 2016.

Functionality
As in Vim and vi, the browser has a command mode and an insert mode. In command mode key bindings can be used to perform functions, for example: 'G' to go to the bottom of a page, and 'gg' to the top. Specific commands can also be bound to keys or key-sequences by the user.
A cheat sheet of all key bindings can be found here and they can be trained here.

qutebrowser is both written in and configured in Python. Through the configuration file custom functionality can be added, including custom key bindings, per-site settings, and arbitrary Python code that can interact with your browser or your system.

Since version 2.0.0, qutebrowser supports blocking ads using the python adblock library. For users that don't have the adblock library installed or use an older version of qutebrowser, a simpler built-in adblocker can be used and modified using the blocked-hosts file that comes with qutebrowser.

Security 
In July 2018, it was found that all versions of qutebrowser prior to 1.4.1 have a cross-site request forgery vulnerability that allowed websites to change qutebrowser settings and, via settings like , possibly execute arbitrary code. This was fixed in version 1.4.1; backported patches are available for prior versions.

See also 
 QtWebEngine – the layout engine that the application uses by default, based on Chromium
 WebKit – the layout engine that the application can optionally use instead of WebEngine
 List of web browsers
 uzbl – another minimalist web browser with similar concept
 Minimalism (computing)

References

External links 
 
 
 qutebrowser on Python Package Index
 qutebrowser on Arch Linux
 qutebrowser on Chocolatey

Free web browsers
Web browsers that use Qt
Cross-platform web browsers
Cross-platform free software
Free software programmed in Python
Software using the GPL license
2014 software